Diamond is an Irish surname which is an Anglicized form of Ó Diamáin. Notable people with the surname include:

Aisling Diamond (living), Irish camogie player
Alex Diamond (born 1967), German visual artist, pseudonym of Jörg Heikhaus
Ana Diamond (born 1995), British civil rights activist and unionist politician
Andrew Diamond (born 1969), stage name for American reggae artist Andrew Seidel
Ann Diamond (living), Canadian poet
Ann Diamond (midwife) (c. 1831–1881), New Zealand hotel-keeper, storekeeper, midwife
Anne Diamond (born 1954), British journalist and broadcaster
Arthur Diamond (c. 1844–1906), Australian businessperson and politician
Barry Diamond, (born 1951), American comedian
Barry Diamond (footballer) (born 1960), Scottish footballer
Bernard Diamond (1827–1892), Irish recipient of the Victoria Cross
Bernard L. Diamond (1912–1990), American psychiatrist and legal scholar
Bob Diamond (banker) (born 1951), Anglo-American banker and business executive
Bobby Diamond (1943-2019), American actor and lawyer
Charles Diamond (1858–1934), Irish newspaper entrepreneur and politician
Charley Diamond (born 1936), American football player
Cora Diamond (born 1937), U.S.-born philosopher
David Diamond (disambiguation), several names
Debi Diamond (born 1965), American pornographic actress
Dion Diamond (born 1941), American civil rights activist
Dustin Diamond (1977–2021), American actor
Fred Diamond (born 1964), American mathematician
Gregg Diamond (1949–1999), American musician
Harold Diamond (1926-1982), American art dealer
Harry Diamond (disambiguation), several names
I. A. L. Diamond (1920–1988), Romanian-born American film writer
Jack Diamond (disambiguation), several names
Jack "Legs" Diamond (1897–1931), Irish-American gangster
Jared Diamond (born 1937), American biologist, physiologist, biogeographer and author
Jeremy Diamond (journalist), American journalist
Jim Diamond (music producer) (born 1965), American studio engineer, producer and bass player
Jim Diamond (singer) (born 1953), Scottish rock musician
Jody Diamond (born 1953), American composer, performer, writer, publisher, editor, and educator
John Diamond (journalist) (1953–2001), British Jewish broadcaster and journalist
John Diamond, Baron Diamond (1907–2004), British politician
King Diamond (born 1956), Danish heavy metal musician 
Lance Diamond (1945–2015), American lounge singer and radio personality
Larry Diamond (born 1951), political scientist
Lou Diamond (1897–1951), US Marine
Marian Diamond (1926–2017), professor of anatomy at the University of California, Berkeley
Martha Diamond (born 1942), American artist
Michael Diamond (born 1965), American musician Mike D, member of the Beastie Boys, son of Harold
Michael Diamond (sport shooter) (born 1972), Australian target shooter 
Milton Diamond (born 1934), American professor of anatomy and reproductive biology
Mya Diamond (born 1981), Hungarian pornographic actress
Neil Diamond (born 1941), American singer/songwriter
Patrick Diamond (born 1974) British politician and policy advisor
Paul Diamond (born 1961), Croatia-born Canadian wrestler 
Paul S. Diamond (born 1953), United States District Judge 
Peter Diamond (born 1940), American economist
Phil Diamond (born 1958), professor at University of Manchester
Randy Diamond (born 1987), Honduran footballer
Rebecca Diamond (born 1967), American television journalist
Rebecca Diamond (born 1988), American economist
Reed Diamond (born 1967), American actor
Sarah E. Diamond (living), American biologist
Scott Diamond (born 1986), Canadian baseball pitcher
Selma Diamond (1920–1985), Canadian-born comedic actress and TV writer
Shea Diamond (born 1978), American singer-songwriter
Simon-Pierre Diamond (born 1985), Canadian politician
Stanley Diamond (1922–1991), American anthropologist
Zander Diamond (born 1985), Scottish footballer

Fictional characters
Bob Diamond (comics), a Marvel Comics character
Bob Diamond, a fictional advocate in the movie "Defending Your Life"
Richard Diamond, private detective protagonist of Richard Diamond, Private Detective, which aired on radio from 1949 to 1953, and on television from 1957 to 1960.

See also
Amy Diamond, former stage name for English-Swedish pop singer Amy Deasismont
Benjamin Diamond, vocalist on the song "Music Sounds Better with You" (1998)

Damond and Dimond, similar names

English-language surnames
Surnames from ornamental names
Jewish surnames